Paulo Victor Rodrigues Gomes (born 1 July 1988), known as Paulo Victor Gomes, Paulo Victor or just PV, is a Brazilian football coach, currently in charge of Palmeiras' under-20 team.

Career
Born in Barra Bonita, São Paulo, Paulo Victor opted to retire at the age of 18, when he was playing for the under-20 side of XV de Jaú. He began his managerial career in a school in his hometown, before joining Novorizontino in 2013, to work in the club's youth categories.

In 2015, Paulo Victor moved to Palmeiras, being in charge of the under-16 side for six months before taking over the under-15s. On 4 August 2017, he was named manager of the Brazil national under-15 team.

On 4 September 2020, Paulo Victor was appointed in charge of the Brazil national under-17 team, and was also an assistant of André Jardine in the Olympic team during the 2020 Summer Olympics. On 20 October 2021, he returned to Palmeiras after being named manager of the under-20s.

In December 2021, after Abel Ferreira and the first team were on vacation, Paulo Victor was named in charge of the main squad for the last two matches of the 2021 Série A. He achieved one draw against Athletico Paranaense, and one win over Ceará, before returning to his previous role.

Back to the under-20s for the 2022 season, Paulo Victor led the side to their first-ever Copa São Paulo de Futebol Júnior title. After also winning the Campeonato Brasileiro Sub-20 and the Copa do Brasil Sub-20 later in the year, he again won the Copinha in 2023.

Honours
Brazil U15
South American U-15 Championship: 2019

Palmeiras
: 2021
Copa São Paulo de Futebol Júnior: 2022, 2023
Campeonato Brasileiro Sub-20: 2022
Copa do Brasil Sub-20: 2022
Supercopa do Brasil Sub-20: 2022

References

External links

1988 births
Living people
Sportspeople from São Paulo (state)
Brazilian football managers
Campeonato Brasileiro Série A managers
Sociedade Esportiva Palmeiras managers
People from Barra Bonita, São Paulo